Yakov Etinger is the name of:

 Yakov Gilyarievich Etinger (1887–1951), Soviet physician
 Yakov Yakovlevich Etinger (1929–2014), Russian politologist, essayist, historian and political activist; adopted son of Yakov Gilyarievich Etinger